Biopiracy (also known as scientific colonialism) is defined as the unauthorized appropriation of knowledge and genetic resources of farming and indigenous communities by individuals or institutions seeking exclusive monopoly control through patents or intellectual property. While bioprospecting is the act of exploring natural resources for undiscovered chemical compounds with medicinal or anti-microbial properties, commercial success from bioprospecting leads to the company's attempt at protecting their intellectual property rights on indigenous medicinal plants, seeds, genetic resources, and traditional medicines.

Moreover, if biological resources and traditional knowledge are taken from indigenous or marginalized groups, the commercialization of their natural resource can harm  communities. Despite the medicinal and innovative benefits of bioprospecting and biochemical research, the expropriation of indigenous land for their genetic resources without fair compensation inevitably leads to exploitation. Biopiracy can harm indigenous populations in multiple ways. Without proper compensation or reward for traditional knowledge of natural resources, the sudden increase in commercial value of the species producing the active compound can make it now unaffordable for the native people. In some cases, a patent filed by the western company could prohibit the use or sell of the resource by any individual or institution, including the indigenous group. With nearly one third of all small-molecule drugs approved by the U.S. Food and Drug Administration (FDA) between 1981 and 2014 being either natural products or compounds derived from natural products, bioprospecting or piracy is growing more significantly, especially in the pharmaceutical industry.

With the advancement of extraction techniques of genetic material in biochemistry and molecular biology, scientists are now able to identify a specific gene, which directs to enzymes capable of converting one molecule to another. This scientific breakthrough brings up the question of whether the organism containing the gene that has been modified through a series of tests and experiments should be accredited to the country of origin.

History

Colonial implications 
Biopiracy is historically associated with colonialism, where developing resource-rich countries and indigenous populations would be exploited without permission. Since the arrival of European settlers in search of gold, silver, and rare spices, the wealth of knowledge on plant-based riches was highly valued. Following Marco Polo's journey through Southwestern India and China, Christopher Columbus expanded upon the "Spice Route" with the help of the Spanish Court. These explorers, amongst hundreds more, share an infamous history of pillaging through indigenous villages and depriving countries of their natural resources. Western food and pharmaceutical companies have profited immensely from these efforts. Valuable commodities like sugar, pepper, quinine, and coffee were all taken from colonized countries that led to environmental destructions in the corresponding developing countries.

The General Agreement on Tariffs and Trade (GATT) of 1947 was an effort to encourage international trade by reducing or eliminating trade barriers like tariffs or quotas. Trade-Related Intellectual Property Rights (TRIPS) was negotiated at the end of GATT. Similarly, Columbus set a precedent in 1492 through land titles granted by European kings and queens, which acted as a sort of patent for colonizers. The World Trade Organization (WTO) agreement of TRIPS attempts to signal the importance of maintaining a balance between trade and intellectual property. This agreement, since 1994, requires WTO member countries to develop legal frameworks to protect plant and animal resources in agricultural, pharmaceutical, chemical, textile, or other commodity contexts. Several countries have criticized this agreement, claiming that it's counterproductive in protecting their natural resources.

The Eurocentric roots of property claiming and piracy are reinforced by modern Intellectual Property laws established by GATT and WTO which supplements the colonial ideas to "discover and conquer" and to "subdue, occupy, and possess." Environmental activist and food sovereignty advocate Vandana Shiva calls patenting and claiming rights to genetic material and bio-resources "the second coming of Columbus" due to its reinforcement of colonial power dynamics. For example, the intellectual property for Indian products like tamarind, turmeric, and Darjeeling tea have been taken and patented by private corporations in historically colonial countries. More specifically, in 2010 The University of Michigan attempted to patent curcumin, the active ingredient of turmeric powder, to create drugs used for wound healing without directly crediting Indian communities, where turmeric was traditionally used in medicine for treating wounds, infections and skin problems for centuries.

"Gene Rush" in Sri Lanka 
The "Gene Rush" is the new era of biotechnology that allows scientists to extract specific genes from living organisms as raw materials. With the introduction of deoxyribonucleic acid (DNA) research, Sri Lanka has been marked with imminent danger as a target of biopiracy. Spotted in the top 34 biodiversity hotspots, Sri Lanka claims the highest biodiversity per unit area of terrestrial among Asian countries. Currently, Sri Lanka has 1,500 identified species of medicinal herbs and plants, and its attraction to biopiracy has put environment protection and conservation at a significant priority in the country. Recent efforts were enacted by United Nations Industrial Development Organization (UNIDO) in collaboration with the Spice Council and the government of Sri Lanka to enhance the productive capacities and competitiveness of the cinnamon value chain in the country.

Terminology 
"Biopiracy" was coined in the early 1990s by Pat Mooney, founder of ETC Group which works to protect the world's most vulnerable people from socioeconomic and environmental impacts of new, modern technologies. He defines it as when researchers or research organizations take biological resources without official sanction, largely from less affluent countries or marginalized people. Biopiracy includes theft or misappropriation of genetic resources and traditional knowledge through the intellectual property system and unauthorized and uncompensated collection of genetic resources for commercial purposes. Mooney, along with other critics of the patent system, believes that the current intellectual property system creates inequities in the system by allowing wealthy and powerful groups of people to own the most basic building blocks of life.

Intellectual Property 

Intellectual property (IP) rights include patents, copyright, industrial design rights, trademarks, plant variety rights, trade dress, geographical indications, and sometimes trade secrets. While intellectual property rights were created to promote and reward scientific knowledge and creativity, but they naturally weigh towards benefiting transnational corporations.

Restrictions in favor of corporations 
The first restriction is the shift from common rights to private rights of knowledge. The preamble of TRIPS agreement acknowledges these rights as private rights. By privatizing intellectual commons, TRIPS encourages corporate monopoly. The second restriction is that IP rights are only recognized when they generate profit, rather than then when they meet social needs. TRIPS agreement clarifies that an innovation must be capable of industrial profit in order to be recognized as an IPR, which discourages recognition of social good.

Examples

Neem tree 
In the arid areas of India, the neem tree, or Azadirachta indica, is a fast-growing evergreen of up to 20 meters in height. From its roots to leaves, the tree contains a number of potent chemical compounds, including azadirachtin which can be found in the seeds. The neem tree has applications in medicine, toiletries, contraception, timber, fuel, and in agriculture. Historically, access to the neem tree's various products has been free or cheap. There are about 14 million neem trees in India, and the centuries old village techniques of seed oil extraction and pesticidal emulsions do not require expensive equipment. Villagers relied on the large number of different medicinal compounds accessible through the neem material which were commonly available. When US timber importer Robert Larson noticed the tree's usefulness in 1971, he conducted research over the next decade on the pesticidal properties in the neem extract called Margosan-O. After gaining clearance for the product from the US Environmental Protection Agency (EPA) in 1985, he sold the patent for the product to W.R. Grace. While the corporation patented the neem tree seed extract for their antifungal spray, Neemex in 1994, neem extracts have been used by rural farmers in India for more than 2,000 years in insect repellants.

Challenge against patent 
India-based Research Foundation for Science, Technology, and Ecology (RFSTE) challenged the US patent with the claim that the qualities of the neem tree and their use had been known in India for over 2,000 years. The Congressional Research Service (CRS) reported to US Congress in justification of the patent claiming that the synthetic form or the process of synthesis of the naturally occurring compound should be patentable. However, the process of synthesis which W.R. Grace claims to be a genuine innovation is simply an advance on Indian techniques which only exists in the context the ignorance of the West. The patent was finally overturned by the EPO in 2000. The village neem tree has become a symbol of Indian Indigenous knowledge and resistance against transnational corporations, and protestors against international property rights legislation carried twigs or branches of neem.

Hoodia cactus 
The Hoodia cactus of the Kalahari Desert was used for thousands of years by the nomadic San people in southern Africa to help survive through hunger and thirst during their long expeditions in the desert. In 2016, the South African Council for Scientific and Industrial Research (CSIR) gained a government-funded patent for a new drug (P57) derived from the cactus for its appetite-suppressing qualities. CSIR scientists isolated the P57 molecule in 1996 after decades of research on indigenous plants. The patented formula was sold to western pharmaceutical multinational companies Pfizer and Phytopharm as a miracle drug for weight loss.

Challenge against patent 
Following the confirmation of the patent, representatives of the San people, backed by the global support of patent-law critics and bioethicists, demanded restitution of their rights to their common intellectual property. After a long dispute, CSIR and the San people came to a confidential 'benefit-sharing' agreement where the San people were given royalties, knowledge exchange and creation of jobs from the industry.

Pineapple leather 

Piña cloth, in the nineteenth century, was a creation unique to the Philippines. With fibers collected from the leaves of pineapples, the weaving mechanism of piña is a complex and labor-intensive process used by a small number of women to dress the country's elite. Scraping, the most common method of extracting pineapple leaf fibre (PALF), starts with carefully removing the prickles, epidermis, and pulp from the sides of the leaf with a dull knife. This is followed by exposing the fiber and finely combing it to separate the strands. With the help of a bamboo device, the separated strands are then threaded and weaved together through a delicate process to create a continuous filament. After some years of research and development of potential leather alternatives at the Royal College of Art in London, Dr. Carmen Hijosa, founder and chief creative innovation officer of Ananas Anam, claimed the rights to Piñatex, a leather alternative made from PALF. The patent on this technology makes it nearly impossible for the people of the Philippines and indigenous people to gain credit for the fabric that greatly impacted the shape of their history and culture for generations. Piñatex recently partnered with Dole, promising scaled-up leather production with the waste product from their pineapple farms in the Philippines. Despite the violent history of the Dole Empire, Piñatex has been expanding its market by collaborating with brands like Chanel, H&M, and Nike. The patent remains to this day.

Corporate greenwashing 

Greenwashing is a term coined by environmentalist Jay Westervelt in 1986, meaning the false claims by companies that give the impression of sustainability and environmentalism. Without clarifying the metrics and quantifiable goal of the company's environmental agenda, many big companies attempt to paint the picture of ethical and eco-friendly images. Resources and materials pirated from indigenous communities are often commodified and recycled into corporate environmentalist agendas. Due to the exploitative nature of the fast fashion supply chain, many 'green' collections released by corporations only promote their marketing strategies and increase problems with textile waste and climate change.

Nike received backlash after the 2020 Impact Report which showed the lack of sustainability in footwear. To tackle the feedback, Nike launched the Happy Pineapple Collection featuring Ananas Anam's vegan leather material and a tropical fruit design embroidered across the Air Max 90, the Air Max 95, Air Force One, and Air-Zoom collections.

The Conscious Collection released by H&M in 2010 also partners with Ananas Anam to produce vegan leather jackets. Due to inconclusive data on Piñatex biodegradability, the Norwegian Consumer Authority accused the brand of misleading customers with vague details of the sustainability claims made. The brand responded by saying they would accept the criticism and communicate the extra value.

New efforts 
The Convention on Biological Diversity created by the United Nations in 1992 demanded that bioprospecting should not be done without the consent of the host country. The convention concluded that exploitation of local resources for medicinal and pharmaceutical purposes should actively involve local traditional communities and the produced profit and benefits be shared in an equitable way.

The International Cooperative Biodiversity Group (ICBG) is a network of bioprospecting projects funded by the US government. While the main objective is to discover and research plants bearing chemical compounds that could cure diseases in the United States, the countries hosting the searches can expect equitable rewards and benefits. Local job creation in communities is promoted by conducting the initial extraction and analysis steps in local laboratories. If the research leads to commercialized drugs, 50% of the royalties are invested into community development funds run by indigenous people.

See also 
 Intellectual property
 Bioprospecting
 Greenwashing

References

Biotechnology
Population genetics